The Ploughman's Lunch is a 1983 British drama film written by Ian McEwan and directed by Richard Eyre which features Jonathan Pryce, Tim Curry, and Rosemary Harris.

The film looks at the media world in Margaret Thatcher's Britain around the time of the Falklands War. It was part of Channel 4's Film on Four strand, enjoying a critically lauded theatrical release prior to the television screenings.

Plot 
James Penfield is an ambitious London-based BBC radio reporter, from humble origins but Oxford-educated. He is commissioned to write a book on the Suez Crisis, claiming not to be a socialist; at that time,  the 1982 Falklands War is dominating the British media.

He is attracted to Susan Barrington, an upper class, rather snobbish TV journalist, to whom he is introduced by his Oxford friend and fellow TV journalist, Jeremy Hancock. Although he is persistent, he cannot get further than a late night kiss from her and so Jeremy suggests that he contact her mother, prominent left-wing historian Ann Barrington, who lives in Norfolk and is married to advertising film director Matthew Fox. It transpires that Ann wrote an article on the Suez Crisis on its tenth anniversary and James wants to seduce the daughter by befriending the mother.

Claiming to be a socialist, James soon finds himself spending more time with the mother than her daughter; they have several long discussions and also take long walks on the Norfolk Broads. Meanwhile, his mother is dying and, having earlier said to Susan that his parents are dead in order to disguise his origins, he is forced to identify her only as a relative when his father contacts him while he is with Ann. Returning to London, he is forced to ask for help from members of a women's peace camp after suffering a puncture. Initially mistaken for another BBC man, he shows some feigned sympathy towards the group protesting against the use of force outside a Norfolk airbase. Visiting Norfolk again a week later with an uninterested Susan, James walks alone with Ann Barrington who kisses him and later enters his bedroom and has sex with him.

Caught up in this love triangle, James returns to his work in London. Over a beer and pub ploughman's lunch with Matthew Fox, Fox consents to James making love to his wife, given that they have slept in separate beds for the last three years. James refuses to take calls from the mother when she attempts to contact him at the BBC. He finally gets another Oxford friend and up and coming young poet to make a call to her ending the relationship, while he sits idly by reading advertisements in Exchange and Mart.

James, Jeremy and Susan cover the 1982 Conservative Party Conference and travel down to Brighton together in James' Jaguar. It is at the start of the conference that James first starts to get an inkling of something going on between the other two and directly asks Jeremy if he is up to something. Later, during the conference, he attempts to talk to Susan but she brushes him off and he then sees them caressing each other, having obviously returned from a hotel room. The Conference finishes with Thatcher's closing address as she rouses popular support following the Falklands War and afterwards James confronts his friend in the Brighton Centre conference hall, rebuking him for having betrayed him; he in turn is told by Jeremy that he has known Susan for fifteen years and that they are 'old allies'.

The film ends with James having a conversation with his publisher about the success of his first book. The closing scene is of James attending his mother's funeral, standing grim-faced and aloof at his father's side, as he impatiently checks his watch.

Cast 
Jonathan Pryce as James Penfield
Tim Curry as Jeremy Hancock
Charlie Dore as Susan Barrington
Rosemary Harris as Ann Barrington
Frank Finlay as Matthew Fox
David de Keyser as Gold
Bill Paterson as Lecturer
Nat Jackley as Mr Penfield
David Lyon as Newsreader
Orlando Wells as Tom Fox

Reception
In The New York Times, film critic Vincent Canby wrote: "James Penfield, the journalist who glowers at the center of the fine new English film The Ploughman's Lunch, is a fascinating variation on all of the angry, low-born young men who populated British novels and plays in the late 1950s and 60s. Although he denies it, he is angry. At one point he says: 'You do everything right and you feel nothing. Either way.' His problem is that he feels everything all too acutely, but it doesn't make him a better person, only more devious. James Penfield is Jimmy Porter of Look Back in Anger updated to the 1980s, specifically to London during the 1982 Falkland war and the Tory leadership of Prime Minister Margaret Thatcher. The Ploughman's Lunch, the first theatrical film to be written by Ian McEwan and directed by Richard Eyre, is a witty, bitter tale of duplicity and opportunism in both private and public life...This is tricky stuff, but The Ploughman's Lunch blends fact with fiction with astonishing success."

Box office
Goldcrest Films invested £398,000 in the movie and received £271,000 causing them to lose £127,000.

The film was seen by 1.7 million people on English television.

References

External links
 Vincent Canby on The Ploughman's Lunch in The New York Times
 Robert McCrum on Ian McEwan—"The Story of his Life"—in The Guardian

 

1983 drama films
1983 films
1983 independent films
1980s British films
1980s English-language films
British drama films
British independent films
Cultural depictions of Margaret Thatcher
Falklands War films
Films about the mass media in the United Kingdom
Films directed by Richard Eyre
Films set in Norfolk
Films with screenplays by Ian McEwan
Goldcrest Films films
Methuen Publishing books
Suez Crisis fiction